The 2021 Turkish Women's Cup, also named Festival Women's Trophy 2021, was the fourth edition of the Turkish Women's Cup, an invitational women's football tournament held annually in Turkey. It took place between 17 and 23 February in Antalya. Originally, there were to be two separate, unconnected tournaments involving four teams each. However, because of inadequate documentation, the second tournament that had been announced (involving India, Serbia, Russia and Ukraine) became simply a series of friendly matches.

Teams

Squads

Results

Group A 

All times are local (UTC+3).

Group B 

All times are local (UTC+3).

Goalscorers

References

Turkish Women's Cup
Turkish Women's Cup
Turkish Women's Cup
Turkish Women's Cup
Turkish